The Three Graces is an oil painting of the Three Graces by Peter Paul Rubens.

The painting was held in the personal collection of the artist until his death, then was purchased by king Philip IV of Spain and in 1666 it went to the Royal Alcazar of Madrid, before hanging in the Museo del Prado.

There were other variations by Rubens on the theme of Three Graces. Physical dimensions of this painting are 221 cm × 181 cm (87 in × 71 in) without frame.

The painting features in comedian Hannah Gadsby's stand-up show Douglas

References

1639 paintings
Paintings by Peter Paul Rubens in the Museo del Prado
Rubens
Mythological paintings by Peter Paul Rubens